Kai/Konton is a collaborative album by Bill Laswell, Yoshi Otani, Manabu Murata and Munenori Senju. It released on March 2, 2011 by P-Vine Records.

Track listing

Personnel 
Adapted from the Konton liner notes.
Musicians
Bill Laswell – bass guitar, producer
Yoshi Otani – saxophone, effects
Manabu Murata – guitar
Munenori Senju – drums
Technical personnel
John Brown – design
James Dellatacoma – assistant engineer
Michael Fossenkemper – mastering
Robert Musso – engineering
Hisaaki Oshima – recording

Release history

References 

2011 albums
Collaborative albums
Bill Laswell albums
Albums produced by Bill Laswell
P-Vine Records albums